The Centenary Gentlemen and Ladies are composed of 20 teams representing Centenary College of Louisiana in intercollegiate athletics, including men and women's basketball, cross country, golf, soccer, and swimming. Men's sports include football, baseball and lacrosse. Women's sports include gymnastics, softball, and volleyball. The Gentlemen and Ladies compete in the NCAA Division III and are members of the Southern Collegiate Athletic Conference. Prior to 2011, Centenary was a member of the NCAA Division I, and competed in the Summit League.

Sports sponsored 

Centenary College sponsors nine men's and nine women's team in NCAA sanctioned sports.

Baseball

The Centenary Gentlemen baseball team represents Centenary College. The school's team currently competes in the Southern Collegiate Athletic Conference, which is part of the NCAA Division III. The team plays home games at the Shehee Stadium.

Men's basketball

The Centenary Gentlemen basketball team represents Centenary College. The school's team currently competes in the Southern Collegiate Athletic Conference, which is part of the NCAA Division III. The team plays home games at the Gold Dome.

Women's basketball
The Centenary Ladies basketball team represents Centenary College. The school's team currently competes in the Southern Collegiate Athletic Conference, which is part of the NCAA Division III. The team plays home games at the Gold Dome.

Gymnastics
Gymnastics competes in Division I as a member of the Midwest Independent Conference.

Football

Centenary College of Louisiana had previously fielded a football team from 1909 to 1941. On November 10, 2021, the college announced that it would be reviving its football team starting in Fall 2024.

References

External links